Jankhot Qushuq was the Kabardian Grand Prince between 1809 and 1822 and head of the Kabardian Provisional Court between 1822 and 1830.

Family 
A member of the Kabardian Bekmirza family, he was the oldest son of Prince Jantoq.

He married three times. He had three sons and two daughters. His oldest son drowned in the Kuban river and his second oldest son died in Georgiyevsk. His youngest son Jambulat was killed in 1825 by Russians. His brothers were baptised and accepted Christianity.

References 

1758 births
1830 deaths